Walnut is a city in the eastern part of Los Angeles County in the U.S. state of California. At the 2010 census, the city had a population of 29,172, and in 2019 the population was estimated at 29,685.

The greater Walnut Valley is located between the steep San Jose Hills mountain range to the north, and the gentle Puente Hills to the south. The city hosts a highly ranked public school system—the Walnut Valley Unified School District, which has been ranked by numerous sources as one of the top public school districts in Southern California as well as Mt. San Antonio College. Walnut is one of the cities with the lowest crime rates in the San Gabriel Valley.

According to the 2010 United States Census, Walnut has a median household income at one of the top-earning percentiles in the country at $101,250.

The city's name is derived from the Rancho Los Nogales Mexican land grant, nogales being the Spanish word for "walnut trees"; the native California black walnut is a common tree, native to the San Jose Hills. The City of Walnut is a general law city incorporated on January 19, 1959. It is governed by a city council/city manager form of government. A five-member city council is elected by the residents, and a mayor is elected annually by the council to serve a twelve-month term. A city manager is appointed by the council to oversee the daily activities of the city.

Geography
Walnut is located on the southern slopes of the San Jose Hills, with West Covina to the northwest, Covina to the north, San Dimas to the northeast, Pomona to the east, Diamond Bar, Rowland Heights, and the City of Industry to the south, and La Puente to the west. Several small creeks (i.e. Snow Creek, Lemon Creek) run mostly to the south toward the valley of San Jose Creek, which runs west to the San Gabriel River.

Climate

History

The area are the traditional lands of the Tongva people. Spanish missionaries who arrived in the 18th century called the indigenes Gabrieleño, because the area where they lived was controlled by the San Gabriel Mission. The Walnut area was part of the network of outlying ranches used for the grazing of cattle and sheep by the Mission.

Following secularization of the missions in the 1830s, former mission lands were divided into ranchos, and given away as land grants by the Mexican government of Alta California. In the Walnut area, the first grants were Rancho San Jose (granted to Ricardo Vejar and Ygnacio Palomares in 1837); Rancho Los Nogales (granted to Jose De La Cruz Linares in 1840); and Rancho La Puente (granted to John Rowland and William Workman in 1842). In 1868, John Rowland and William Workman divided Rancho La Puente, leaving Rowland the eastern half and Workman the western half. Rowland's land included the western portion of Walnut and the adjacent community now called Rowland Heights. The land was used mainly for raising cattle and growing wheat, grapes, and fruit trees (mostly citrus).

In 1895, the first U.S. post office was established and given the name "Lemon". In 1908, the post office name was changed to Walnut. As a reminder of those early days, the U.S. Post Office is on Lemon Avenue, one of the town's main streets.

The City of Walnut's Bicentennial Commission selected the construction of Lemon Creek Park and the restoration of the William R. Rowland Adobe Redwood Ranch House as Walnut's bicentennial project. In 1872, the Lemon Creek Park area became the property of Sheriff William Rowland, who inherited the  ranch from his father, John Rowland. The modest structure built in 1883 served as the home of Mr. Meridith, ranch foreman for William Rowland. The adobe redwood ranch house is one of the few remaining original ranch style redwood and adobe structures in the area. On October 1, 1975, the State Landmark Committee placed the W.R. Rowland ranch house in the National Registry of Historical Places.

Walnut Family Festival
Walnut holds an annual Walnut Family Festival. On the day of festival, several streets in the area (such as portions of Lemon and La Puente) are closed in the morning and a parade is held in which many local clubs and groups participate. Later in the afternoon, a fair with booths, games, food, and activities is held in Suzanne Park, adjacent to Suzanne Middle School. The Walnut Family Festival usually occurs in early or mid-October.

Mt. SAC Relays

Started in 1959, the Mt. SAC Relays are an annual track and field festival held primarily at Hilmer Lodge Stadium on the Mt. San Antonio College campus. The April festival attracts many elite athletes from around the world to the city of Walnut. This meet and other elite track meets held at the stadium, including the 1968 Olympic Trials and two editions of the USA Outdoor Track and Field Championships have emblazoned the identification of "Walnut, California" in numerous national records in athletics around the world. At various points in time, many world records were set at the Mt. SAC Relays.

The October Mt. SAC Cross Country Invitational, run in the hills surrounding the stadium, proclaims itself to be the largest Cross Country meeting in the world. Much of the same course is used as the annual CIF Southern Section championships and the western qualifier for the Foot Locker Cross Country Championships.

Economy
Shea Homes, and the United States divisions of the Filipino home video company Viva Video, Inc. and the Japanese card game company Bushiroad are based in Walnut.

According to the 2010 United States Census, Walnut had a median household income of $101,250, with 6.2% of the population living below the federal poverty line.

According to the city's 2017 Comprehensive Annual Financial Report, the principal employers in the city are:

Infrastructure
The Los Angeles County Sheriff's Department (LASD) operates the Walnut/Diamond Bar Station in Walnut.

The Los Angeles County Department of Health Services operates the Pomona Health Center in Pomona, serving Walnut.

Government

State and federal 

While the Congressional, State Senate, and State Assembly districts that Walnut is located in may have tendencies to vote for Republican candidates, since the 2000 election Walnut has voted only for Democratic presidential, gubernatorial, and senatorial candidates, with the exceptions of 2003 and 2006 when they voted for Arnold Schwarzenegger. Walnut voters break down by party affiliation 63.102% Democratic and 35.598% Republican.

Education
Primary education in Walnut is generally served by the prestigious Walnut Valley Unified School District (WVUSD), which has been ranked by numerous sources to be one of the top public school districts in all of Southern California; it also serves parts of the city of Diamond Bar. Schools located in and around Walnut include:

C.J. Morris Elementary School
Collegewood Elementary School
Oswalt Academy (Formerly known as Oswalt Elementary School) (Rowland Unified School District)
Vejar Elementary School
Walnut Elementary School
Westhoff Elementary School
Suzanne Middle School
Southlands Christian Schools
South Pointe Middle School
Chaparral Middle School 
Ronald Hockwalt Academies (Formerly known as Del Paso High School)
Walnut High School
Diamond Bar High School

Portions of the western side of Walnut are also served by the Rowland Unified School District.

In addition, Mt. San Antonio College, one of the California Community Colleges, is also located in Walnut near its border with Pomona.

Surrounding suburban cities
  Diamond Bar, California (which shares the same school district with Walnut)
 City of Industry, California
 Pomona, California

Demographics

2010 census
According to the 2010 United States Census, Walnut had a median household income of $101,250, with 6.2% of the population living below the federal poverty line.

The 2010 United States Census reported that Walnut had a population of 29,172. The racial makeup of Walnut was 18,567 (63.6%) Asian, 6,913 (23.7%) White (12.5% Non-Hispanic White), 824 (2.8%) African American, 69 (0.2%) Native American, 28 (0.1%) Pacific Islander, 1,750 (6.0%) from other races, and 1,021 (3.5%) from two or more races. Hispanic or Latino of any race were 5,575 persons (19.1%).

The Census reported that 29,138 people (99.9% of the population) lived in households, 22 (0.1%) lived in non-institutionalized group quarters, and 12 (0%) were institutionalized.

There were 8,533 households, out of which 3,492 (40.9%) had children under the age of 18 living in them, 6,298 (73.8%) were opposite-sex married couples living together, 985 (11.5%) had a female householder with no husband present, 394 (4.6%) had a male householder with no wife present. There were 163 (1.9%) unmarried opposite-sex partnerships, and 26 (0.3%) same-sex married couples or partnerships. 627 households (7.3%) were made up of individuals, and 237 (2.8%) had someone living alone who was 65 years of age or older. The average household size was 3.41. There were 7,677 families (90.0% of all households); the average family size was 3.55.

The population was spread out, with 6,088 people (20.9%) under the age of 18, 3,092 people (10.6%) aged 18 to 24, 6,089 people (20.9%) aged 25 to 44, 10,339 people (35.4%) aged 45 to 64, and 3,564 people (12.2%) who were 65 years of age or older. The median age was 43.1 years. For every 100 females, there were 96.2 males. For every 100 females age 18 and over, there were 93.6 males.

The homeowner vacancy rate was 0.8%; the rental vacancy rate was 4.4%. 25,504 people (87.4% of the population) lived in owner-occupied housing units and 3,634 people (12.5%) lived in rental housing units.

2000 census
As of the census of 2000, there were 8,260 households, out of which 50.6% had children under the age of 18 living with them, 77.1% were married couples living together, 9.9% had a female householder with no husband present, and 8.2% were non-families. 5.8% of all households were made up of individuals, and 1.3% had someone living alone who was 65 years of age or older. The average household size was 3.63 and the average family size was 3.74.

In the city, the population was spread out, with 27.8% under the age of 18, 9.8% from 18 to 24, 27.2% from 25 to 44, 28.4% from 45 to 64, and 6.9% who were 65 years of age or older. The median age was 37 years. For every 100 females, there were 96.7 males. For every 100 females age 18 and over, there were 93.5 males.

 Males had a median income of $51,944 versus $36,197 for females. The per capita income for the city was $31,196. About 5.8% of families and 6.5% of the population were below the poverty line, including 7.8% of those under age 18 and 6.3% of those age 65 or over.

The city was recognized in 1999 by CNN as a model of diversity.

As of the census of 2000, there were 30,004 people, 8,260 households, and 7,582 families residing in the city. The population density was 3,340.5 inhabitants per square mile (1,290.0/km). The racial makeup of the city was 55.75% Asian, 28.37% White, 4.20% African American, 0.24% Native American, 0.08% Pacific Islander, 7.65% from other races, and 3.71% from two or more races. Hispanic or Latino of any race were 19.34% of the population.

Notable people
 Aja Naomi King, actress, How to Get Away with Murder
 Kyle MacKinnon, ice hockey center who played for the San Diego Gulls
 Darius McCrary, actor; known most for playing Eddie Winslow on the television show Family Matters

Proposed NFL stadium

In April 2008, billionaire land developer and co-owner of the Los Angeles Lakers and Kings Edward P. Roski unveiled plans for the construction of an $800 million NFL stadium in the neighboring City of Industry. In March 2009, Walnut filed a lawsuit opposing construction of the stadium, but dropped those charges in September.

On October 23, 2009, California governor Arnold Schwarzenegger signed a bill allowing the 75,000-seat stadium to be built in neighboring Industry in hopes of attracting an NFL team there. This bill would also nullify a lawsuit filed by local residents over the project's environmental impact report.

References

External links

 
 Regional Chamber of Commerce - San Gabriel Valley

 
Walnut
Walnut
Walnut
1959 establishments in California
Populated places established in 1959